Fiona Button is an English actress. She is best known for playing Rose Defoe in The Split.

Early years and education
Button was born in Lausanne, Switzerland. She grew up in Newbury, Berkshire where she attended Park House School and the sixth form of St. Bartholomew's School. She studied drama at the University of Birmingham before enrolling at the Webber Douglas Academy of Dramatic Art, graduating in 2007. She made her professional stage debut at the Watermill Theatre in Newbury aged 10 in the Wizard of Oz.

Career

Television
After graduating, Button played parts in Midsomer Murders and The Bill.
In 2008, she played Lucy Bedford in The Palace. From 2010 to 2012 she played Tess Roberts in two series of Lip Service. From 2014 to 2016 she played Jennifer Chambers in series 1 and 2 of Grantchester. In 2018, she was cast as Rose Defoe in the BBC series The Split.

Button has made guest appearances in How Not to Live Your Life, Outcasts,  Foyle's War, Cardinal Burns, Pramface, You, Me and the Apocalypse and as Vera in My Mother and Other Strangers.

Theatre
Button made her West End debut in 2007 in Rock 'n' Roll by Tom Stoppard playing young Esme and Alice. In 2009 she appeared in Madame de Sade for the Donmar Warehouse opposite Judi Dench and Rosamund Pike, then as Sonya in Vanya at the Gate Theatre.  In 2010 she played Rachel in the original cast of Posh at the Royal Court Theatre, then Mabel Chiltern in An Ideal Husband at the Vaudeville Theatre.

In 2013 Button originated the role of Wendy in Wendy and Peter Pan for the Royal Shakespeare Company. Written by Ella Hickson, it is a feminist reimagining of Barrie's original novel, putting Wendy 'the girl who would grow up' in the spotlight. The show became a sell out hit and the production was revived in 2015.

In 2014 Button went on to play Annabella in 'Tis Pity She's a Whore at the Globe Theatre. Dominic Maxwell from The Times said of her performance, "Button has the ability to transmit the knottiest thoughts from behind an easy, poised demeanour. She is an exceptional performer."

In 2016 she played Stef in They Drink It in the Congo at the Almeida Theatre. In 2018 she played Cecily Cardew in The Importance of Being Earnest in the West End.

Personal life
Button lives in London and has been married to screenwriter Henry Fleet since 2014. In 2017, their daughter, Fordy, was born.

Filmography

Film

Television

Theatre credits

References

External links

Alumni of the Webber Douglas Academy of Dramatic Art
English television actresses
English stage actresses
Living people
21st-century English actresses
Year of birth missing (living people)